Monique Boulestin (born 13 March 1951 in Châlus, Haute-Vienne) was a member of the National Assembly of France. She represented Haute-Vienne's 1st constituency, and was a member of the Socialiste, radical, citoyen et divers gauche.

References

1951 births
Living people
People from Haute-Vienne
Radical Party of the Left politicians
Socialist Party (France) politicians
Women members of the National Assembly (France)
Deputies of the 13th National Assembly of the French Fifth Republic
21st-century French women politicians
Knights of the Ordre national du Mérite

Members of Parliament for Haute-Vienne